Stephen Wallace Dempsey (May 8, 1862 – March 1, 1949) was an American Republican politician. He was a member of the United States House of Representatives from New York.

Born in Hartland, New York, Dempsey was an assistant United States Attorney from 1899 to 1907. He was a special assistant to the Attorney General from 1907 to 1912 and was in charge of the prosecutions of Standard Oil and certain railroad companies.

In 1914, Dempsey was elected to Congress and served from March 4, 1915, to March 3, 1931.

S. Wallace Dempsey died at age 86 in Washington, D.C. He is interred in Rock Creek Cemetery.

References 

1862 births
1949 deaths
Burials at Rock Creek Cemetery
Republican Party members of the United States House of Representatives from New York (state)
People from Hartland, New York